Linn Sömskar (born 3 June 1989) is a Swedish cross-country skier and roller skier. She is a ten time gold medalist at the Roller Skiing World Championships. She won multiple medals at the 2019 Roller Skiing World Cup. In cross-country skiing, she has won multiple Scandinavian Cup medals, and was part of the team that won the relay event at the 2018 and 2019 Swedish Championships.

Career
Sömskar trains at IFK Umeå sports club. In 2009, Sömskar was selected for the FIS Junior Cross-Country Skiing World Championships in France. Both of her parents had previously competed at the event in 1980. She came third in the 2012–13 FIS Cross-Country World Cup team sprint event in Liberec, Czech Republic, alongside Magdalena Pajala.

In 2015, Sömskar won a prologue race in Bruksvallarna, Sweden. She competed in the 2015–16 FIS Cross-Country World Cup 15 km event in Davos, Switzerland, as a late replacement for Maria Rydqvist. She came third in the 2015–16 Scandinavian Cup sprint race in Östersund, Sweden. At the 2016–17 Scandinavian Cup, Sömskar came third in the 5 km and 10 km pursuit races in Madona, Latvia.
Sömskar, Jonna Sundling and  won the relay event at the Swedish Championships in 2018 and 2019.

In 2018, Sömskar won both events at the Roller Skiing World Cup event in Torsby, Sweden. In 2019, she won multiple Roller Skiing World Cup medals. She won the 1,500 metres sprint event at the opening World Cup event in Beijing. She came third in the Dresden team sprint event alongside , which was her second career World Cup podium. At the Roller Skiing World Cup event in Madona, Latvia, she won the 200 metres sprint, and 15 km mass start events, and came third in the 10 km event.  At the 2019–20 Scandinavian Cup, Sömskar came third in the 20 km  cross-country race in Vuokatti, Finland, second in the 10 km race in Vuokatti, and third in the 20 km race in Nes, Norway. She came second overall in the Scandinavian Cup overall standings.

In 2020, Sömskar was not selected in the Swedish cross-country team for the 2020–21 season. She then changed discipline to long-distance cross-country skiing, representing Team Nordic Athlete. She had to abandon the race after suffering from blisters on her hands. At the 2021 Swedish Championships, Sömskar and  came seventh in the team sprint event. At the 2021 Roller Skiing World Championships in Val di Fiemme, she won the 10 kilometre freestyle and the classic technique events.

Cross-country skiing results
All results are sourced from the International Ski Federation (FIS).

World Cup

Season standings

Team podiums
 2 podiums – (2 )

Personal life
Sömskar is from Umeå, Sweden. She went to school in Lycksele. Her parents Stina Karlsson and Ingmar Sömskar are former skiers.

Notes

References

External links

1989 births
Living people
Swedish female cross-country skiers
Sportspeople from Umeå
21st-century Swedish women